France were represented by 60 athletes (43 men and 17 women) at the 2010 European Athletics Championships held in Barcelona, Spain.

Participants

Results

References 
 Participants list

2010
Nations at the 2010 European Athletics Championships
European Athletics Championships